Christopher McKnight Nichols is an American historian. He is the Wayne Woodrow Hayes Chair in National Security Studies and Professor of History at The Ohio State University.

Career
Originally from New York City, New York, Nichols was educated at Harvard University, Wesleyan University, and the University of Virginia, where he received his PhD in History in 2008. He previously taught at the University of Virginia, where he was a fellow at the Institute for Advanced Studies in Culture, and at the University of Pennsylvania, where he was an Andrew W. Mellon Postdoctoral Fellow.

In 2014, he launched the Citizenship and Crisis Initiative at Oregon State University with an emphasis on issues at the intersection of citizenship, crisis, politics, international relations, civics, and engaged democracy, along with the centenary of World War I.

He has appeared regularly on C-SPAN, and has been a frequent guest on public radio, on television, and on podcasts and blogs as a commentator on issues of U.S. foreign and domestic politics in historical perspective including the Washington Post, Foreign Policy, the Oregonian, the Huffington Post, the History News Network, Philosophy Talk (aired on NPR), etc.

He is a Member of the Board of Trustees of the Oregon Historical Society and is a permanent member of the Council on Foreign Relations.

He was named Director of the Center for the Humanities at Oregon State University in 2017.   That same year, Nichols became an Organization of American Historians (OAH) Distinguished Lecturer.

Nichols gave a TEDx TED Talk on April 21, 2018 at TEDxPortland, entitled “The Untold Story of American Isolationism” (aka “Why History Matters Today”).

Research
Nichols’ research focuses on the intellectual history of the United States’ role in the world from the Civil War period to the present, with an emphasis on isolationism, internationalism, and globalization. He is also a specialist on American political history and the intellectual and cultural history of the Gilded Age and Progressive Era (1880-1920) through the present.  Nichols is an advocate for the importance of history and the humanities in education and as a way to understand and address some of the most urgent contemporary problems.

Nichols also has researched, written, and presented extensively on the 1918 flu pandemic, including publishing a roundtable in the Journal of the Gilded Age and Progressive Era (2020) and doing a series of talks, including a presentation for C-SPAN to the Center for Presidential History at Southern Methodist University (2020).

Publications

Nichols is the author or editor of six books including:

  Ideologies and U.S. Foreign Relations: New Histories, edited with David Milne (Winter 2021/22); 
  Rethinking American Grand Strategy, edited with Elizabeth Borgwardt and Andrew Preston (2021); Rethinking American Grand Strategy
  Wiley Blackwell Companion to the Gilded Age and Progressive Era, edited with Nancy C. Unger (2017); A Companion to the Gilded Age and Progressive Era | Wiley
  Oxford Encyclopedia of American Military and Diplomatic History, with David Milne and Timothy Lynch (2013); The Oxford Encyclopedia of American Military and Diplomatic History: 2-Volume Set
  Promise and Peril: America at the Dawn of a Global Age'' (2011, 2015) Promise and Peril — Christopher McKnight Nichols
  Prophesies of Godlessness: Predictions of America’s Imminent Secularization from the Puritans to the Present Day, edited with Charles Mathewes (2008). Prophesies of Godlessness: Predictions of America's Imminent Secularization from the Puritans to the Present Day

Awards

In 2015, Nichols  received the Roger D. Bridges Distinguished Service Award from the Society for Historians of the Gilded Age and Progressive Era.     He also received the OSU Phi Kappa Phi Honor Society “emerging scholar” of the year award for “outstanding research or creative activity.” 

Nichols was awarded an Andrew Carnegie Fellowship in 2016.

Nichols was named Outstanding Professor of the Year by the Oregon State University Honor's College in 2014 and was named an Honors College Eminent Professor in 2021.

References

21st-century American historians
21st-century American male writers
Historians of American foreign relations
Harvard University alumni
Wesleyan University alumni
University of Virginia alumni
Oregon State University faculty
Historians from New York (state)
People from New York City
Historians of Oregon
American military historians
Year of birth missing (living people)
Living people
American male non-fiction writers